Dead Leaves is a 2004 Japanese anime film.

Dead Leaves may also refer to:
Dead Leaves (1998 film), a film by Constantin Werner
Dead Leaves (album), an album by Merzbow
"Dead Leaves", a song by Sentenced from the album Frozen

See also
Dead leaf or Kallima inachus, a species of butterfly